El amarillo (English language: The Lizard) is a 2006  Argentine drama film directed and written by Sergio Mazza. The film starred Gabriela Moyano, Alejandro Baratelli and Mirta Fratinni.

Release
The film premiered in Argentina on  12 March 2006 at the Mar del Plata Film Festival. On 6 September 2006 it premiered at the Venice Film Festival in Italy.

References

External links
 

2006 films
2000s Spanish-language films
2006 drama films
Argentine independent films
Argentine drama films
2006 independent films
2000s Argentine films